Conasprella janowskyae is a species of sea snail, a marine gastropod mollusk in the family Conidae, the cone snails and their allies.

Like all species within the genus Conasprella, these cone snails are predatory and venomous. They are capable of "stinging" humans, therefore live ones should be handled carefully or not at all.

Description
The size of the shell varies between 30 mm and 40 mm.

Distribution
This marine species occurs off Yucatán, Mexico to Colombia

References

 Tucker J.K. & Tenorio M.J. (2011) New species of Gradiconus and Kohniconus from the western Atlantic (Gastropoda: Conoidea: Conidae, Conilithidae). Miscellanea Malacologica 5(1): 1-16
 Puillandre N., Duda T.F., Meyer C., Olivera B.M. & Bouchet P. (2015). One, four or 100 genera? A new classification of the cone snails. Journal of Molluscan Studies. 81: 1-23

External links
 To World Register of Marine Species
 

janowskyae
Gastropods described in 2011